Cosmo Alexandre Moreira da Rocha (born 24 April 1982) is a Brazilian professional kickboxer, boxer, and mixed martial artist. He is a former It's Showtime 77MAX World Champion, WMC Intercontinental and WPMF World Champion, W5 World Champion.

On 5 December 2009, he won WMC King's Cup Challenger Tournament in Bangkok, Thailand.

Since becoming a professional MMA competitor in 2011 until his own retirement, he has competed for Bellator and Legacy Fighting Championship, and ONE Championship.

Background
Alexandre, who is named after his grandfather, was born in São Vicente, São Paulo and raised in Santos, Sao Paulo. Growing up, Alexandre competed in football and was talented, going on to play professionally, but ultimately chose to focus on a career in Muay Thai. Alexandre began training in Muay Thai at the age of 19.

Kickboxing career
Alexandre began his professional kickboxing career in October 2004 in his native Brazil. In 2007 he experienced the highs and lows of the kickboxing world as he won the WMC Middleweight (160 lbs) Intercontinental Championship and the WPMF Middleweight (160 lbs) World Championship, only to lose them later in the year.

In 2008, Alexandre became a contestant on the It's Showtime Reality TV series. He made it to the finals against Sem Braan, losing via majority decision.

In 2009, Alexandre picked up his biggest kickboxing win as he defeated John Wayne Parr via TKO in the second round at Evolution 17: King of the Square Ring.  He fought a total of three times that evening, winning the Evolution 17 King's Cup Qualifying tournament title in the process.

He defeated Nampon PKMuaythai via unanimous decision in the lackluster main event of Lion Fight 11 in Las Vegas on 20 September 2013.

He was scheduled to have his rubber match with John Wayne Parr at Powerplay Promotions 22 in Melbourne, Australia on 8 November 2013. However, he did not apply for his visa in time and was unable to enter the country and so he was replaced by New Zealand's Brad Riddell who Parr defeated by unanimous decision.

He defeated Mark Holst via UD in the main event of Lion Fight 15 in Ledyard, Connecticut on 23 May 2014.

In 2015, Alexandre defeated John Wayne Parr in the long-awaited rubber match by unanimous decision at Lion Fight 25. He won the Lion Fight Super Middleweight Belt.

Alexandre defeated Elliot Compton by second-round knockout at ONE: Heroes of Honor on April 20, 2018.

Alexandre lost to Nieky Holzken by second-round knockout at ONE: Warrior's Dream on November 17, 2018.

Alexandre faced Juan Cervantes on November 19, 2022, at ONE on Prime Video 4. He won the fight via technical knockout in the second round and announced his retirement during the post-fight interview.

Mixed martial arts career

Bellator Fighting Championships
In August 2011, Alexandre signed a multi-fight deal with the Bellator Fighting Championships, a United States-based mixed martial arts promotion.

Alexandre had a disappointing debut in October 2011 as he lost to Josh Quayhagen via decision at Bellator 52.  He subsequently rebounded with a current streak of 5 wins in a row (all in Bellator)- a TKO win over Avery McPhatter at Bellator 58; a decision win over Lowrant-T Nelson at Bellator 67; a TKO win over Harry Johnson at Bellator 73; a TKO win due to doctor's stoppage over Mike Bannon at Bellator 77; and a decision win over Josh Quayhagen, avenging his only loss in a rematch at Bellator 80.  He amassed a 5–1 record in Bellator.

Additionally, Alexandre trained extensively with Rashad Evans and K-1 fighter Tyrone Spong leading up to Evans' fight at UFC 133 with Tito Ortiz.

World Series of Fighting
In November 2015, Alexandre signed an exclusive deal with World Series of Fighting. However, the promotion never used Alexandre and he was eventually allowed to fight elsewhere.

ONE Championship
Alexandre ended up signing a six-fight contract with the ONE Championship in 2018.

After nearly three years away from MMA action, Alexandre faced Sage Northcutt on 17 May 2019 at the ONE Championship: Enter the Dragon. He won the fight via knockout just 29 seconds into the first round.

On 11 August 2020, Alexandre revealed that he had signed a new, six-fight contract with ONE Championship. Alexandre faced Juan Cervantes, in his first fight after re-signing with the promotion, at ONE on Prime Video 4 on November 19, 2022. He won the fight by a second-round technical knockout.

Titles
ONE Championship
 Performance of the Night (One time) 
World version W5
 2016 W5 World Champion -75 kg
 2014 W5 Kickboxing World Champion -71 kg
A.M.T.I.
 2015 A.M.T.I. (162lbs) South American
Lion Fight
 2015 Lion Fight Promotions Super middleweight Champion
It's Showtime
 2010 It's Showtime 77MAX World Championship
 2008 It's Showtime Reality finalist
World Muaythai Council
 2010 WMC/S1 King's Cup Challenger Tournament Runner up
 2009 WMC/S1 King's Cup Challenger Tournament Champion
 2007 WMC Intercontinental Champion (160 lbs)
Evolution 17
 2009 Evolution 17 Winner King's Cup Qualifying tournament champion
World Professional Muaythai Federation
 2007 WPMF Middleweight World Champion (160 lbs)

Kickboxing record 

|-  style="background:#cfc;"
| 2022-11-19 || Win ||align=left| Juan Cervantes  || ONE on Prime Video 4 || Kallang, Singapore || KO (right elbow) || 2 || 1:23 
|-  style="background:#fbb;"
| 2018-11-17 || Loss ||align=left| Nieky Holzken  || ONE: Warrior's Dream || Jakarta, Indonesia || KO (uppercut) || 2 || 2:59
|-  style="background:#cfc;"
|2018-04-20 || Win ||align=left| Elliot Compton || ONE: Heroes of Honor ||Philippines || KO (left knee to the body) || 2 || 2:46
|-  style="background:#cfc;"
|2017-01-13 || Win ||align=left| Tan Xiaofeng || Superstar Fight 7 || Hunan, China || Decision (unanimous) || 3 || 3:00
|-  style="background:#cfc;"
|2016-10-08 || Win ||align=left| Matouš Kohout || W5 Grand Prix "Legends in Prague", Semi Finals || Prague, Czech Republic || Decision (unanimous) || 3 || 3:00
|-
! style=background:white colspan=9 |
|-  style="background:#cfc;"
|2016-10-08 || Win ||align=left| Darryl Sichtman || W5 Grand Prix "Legends in Prague", Semi Finals || Prague, Czech Republic || Ext. R. Decision (unanimous) || 4 || 3:00
|-  style="background:#cfc;"
| 2016-02-27 || Win ||align=left| Luo Can|| Superstar Fight 1 || China || KO (left jumping knee to the body) || 3 || 3:00
|-  style="background:#fbb;"
| 2015-12-05 || Loss ||align=left| Artem Pashporin || W5 Grand Prix Vienna XXXI || Vienna, Austria || Decision (unanimous) || 3 || 3:00
|-  style="background:#cfc;"
| 2015-11-22 || Win ||align=left|  Julio Dominguez || Portuários Stadium || São Paulo, Brazil || KO (knee to the ribs) || 1 || 2:00
|-
! style=background:white colspan=9 |
|-  style="background:#cfc;"
| 2015-10-23 || Win ||align=left| John Wayne Parr || Lion Fight 25 || Temecula, California, USA || Decision (unanimous) || 5 || 3:00
|-
! style=background:white colspan=9 |
|-  style="background:#cfc;"
| 2015-08-30 || Win ||align=left| Marco Piqué || W5 GRAND PRIX MOSCOW XXX || Moscow, Russia || Decision (unanimous) || 3 || 3:00
|-  style="background:#cfc;"
| 2015-01-16 || Win ||align=left| Regian Eersel || Legacy Kickboxing 1 || Houston, USA || Decision (unanimous) || 3 || 3:00
|-  style="background:#cfc;"
| 2014-11-30 || Win ||align=left| Alexander Surzhko || W5 Crossroad of Times, Semi Finals || Bratislava, Slovakia || Decision (unanimous) || 3 || 3:00
|-
! style=background:white colspan=9 |
|-  style="background:#cfc;"
| 2014-11-30 || Win ||align=left| Dzhabar Askerov || W5 Crossroad of Times, Semi Finals || Bratislava, Slovakia || Decision (unanimous) || 3 || 3:00
|-  style="background:#fbb;"
| 2014-08-01 || Loss ||align=left| Jo Nattawut || Lion Fight 17 || Ledyard, Connecticut, USA || Decision (unanimous) || 5 || 3:00
|-  style="background:#fbb;"
| 2014-06-27 || Loss ||align=left| Yohan Lidon || Strikefight || Lyon, France || Decision (unanimous) || 3 || 3:00
|-  style="background:#cfc;"
| 2014-05-23 || Win ||align=left| Mark Holst || Lion Fight 15 || Ledyard, Connecticut, USA || Decision (unanimous) || 5 || 3:00
|-  style="background:#cfc;"
| 2013-09-20 || Win ||align=left| Nampon PKMuaythai || Lion Fight 11 || Las Vegas, NV || Decision (unanimous) || 5 || 3:00
|-  style="background:#fbb;"
| 2011-08-20 || Loss ||align=left| Sakmongkol Sithchuchok || Battle in the Desert 3 || Primm, NV || Decision (unanimous) || 5 || 3:00
|-  style="background:#cfc;"
| 2011-05-14 || Win ||align=left| Cyrus Washington || Battle in the Desert 2|| Primm, NV || Decision (unanimous) || 5 || 3:00
|-  style="background:#fbb;"
| 2011-03-12 || Loss ||align=left| Giorgio Petrosyan || Fight Code: Dragon Series Round 2 || Milan, Italy || Decision || 3 || 3:00
|-  style="background:#fbb;"
| 2010-12-05|| Loss ||align=left| Yodsanklai Fairtex || King's Birthday 2010, Final || Bangkok, Thailand || Decision || 3 || 2:00
|-
! style=background:white colspan=9 |
|-  style="background:#cfc;"
| 2010-12-05|| Win ||align=left| Alex Vogel || King's Birthday 2010, Semi Finals || Bangkok, Thailand || Decision || 3 || 2:00
|-  style="background:#cfc;"
| 2010-12-05|| Win ||align=left| Jesse Miles || King's Birthday 2010, Quarter Finals || Bangkok, Thailand || Decision || 3 || 2:00
|-  style="background:#fbb;"
| 2010-05-29 || Loss ||align=left| Nieky Holzken || It's Showtime 2010 Amsterdam || Amsterdam, Netherlands || Decision (4–1) || 3 || 3:00
|-  style="background:#cfc;"
| 2010-04-17 || Win ||align=left| Csaba Györfy || It's Showtime 2010 Budapest || Budapest, Hungary || TKO (doctor stoppage) || 1 || N/A
|-
! style=background:white colspan=9 |
|-  style="background:#cfc;"
| 2010-03-13 || Win ||align=left| Dmitry Shakuta || Oktagon presents: It's Showtime 2010 || Milan, Italy || TKO (doctor stoppage) || 2 || N/A
|-
! style=background:white colspan=9 |
|-  style="background:#cfc;"
| 2009-12-05 || Win ||align=left| Madsua || Kings Birthday 2009 Muaythai Championship, Sanam Luang || Bangkok, Thailand || TKO (low kicks) || 2 || N/A
|-
! style=background:white colspan=9 |
|-  style="background:#cfc;"
| 2009-12-05|| Win ||align=left| Naruepol Fairtex || Kings Birthday 2009 Muaythai Championship, Sanam Luang || Bangkok, Thailand || TKO (low kick) || 3 || N/A
|-  style="background:#cfc;"
| 2009-12-05 || Win ||align=left| Kevyan Houshangy || Kings Birthday 2009 Muaythai Championship, Sanam Luang || Bangkok, Thailand || TKO (doctor stoppage) || 2 || N/A
|-  style="background:#cfc;"
| 2009-08-29 || Win ||align=left| Madsua || Evolution 17: King of the Square Ring || Chandler, Australia || Decision (unanimous)|| 3 || 3:00
|-
! style=background:white colspan=9 |
|-  style="background:#cfc;"
| 2009-08-29 || Win ||align=left| John Wayne Parr || Evolution 17: King of the Square Ring || Chandler, Australia || TKO (low kicks) || 2 || N/A
|-  style="background:#cfc;"
| 2009-08-29 || Win ||align=left| Dzhabar Askerov || Evolution 17: King of the Square Ring || Chandler, Australia || Decision (unanimous)|| 3 || 3:00
|-  style="background:#fbb;"
| 2009-06-26 || Loss ||align=left| Yodsaenklai Fairtex || Champions of Champions 2 || Montego Bay, Jamaica || KO (left low kick) || 4 || 0:25
|-
! style=background:white colspan=9 |
|-  style="background:#cfc;"
| 2009-02-14 || Win ||align=left| Murthel Groenhart || Oktagon presents: It's Showtime 2009 || Milan, Italy || Decision (unanimous)|| 3 || 3:00
|-  style="background:#fbb;"
| 2008-10-18 || Loss ||align=left| Eugene Ekkelboom || Supremacy Part 5 "Unbreakable" || Perth, Western Australia || Decision (split) || 5 || 3:00
|-  style="background:#fbb;"
| 2008-04-26 || Loss ||align=left| Sem Braan || K-1 World GP '08 Amsterdam, It's Showtime Reality TV Show '08 Final || Amsterdam, Netherlands || Decision (majority) || 3 || 3:00
|-
! style=background:white colspan=9 |
|-  style="background:#cfc;"
| 2008-04-00 || Win ||align=left| Gregory Choplin || It's Showtime Reality TV 2008, Semi Final || Koh Samui, Thailand || Ext. R. KO (knee) || 4 || N/A
|-  style="background:#cfc;"
| 2008-04-00 || Win ||align=left| Asonitis Costa || It's Showtime Reality TV 2008, Quarter Final || Koh Samui, Thailand || Decision (unanimous) || 3 || 3:00
|-  style="background:#cfc;"
| 2008-01-28 || Win ||align=left| Carlos Cabrera || N/A || Suphanburi, Thailand || Decision (unanimous) || 5 || 3:00
|-  style="background:#fbb;"
| 2007-12-01 || Loss ||align=left| John Wayne Parr || Evolution 12 || Chandler, Australia || Decision (unanimous) || 5 || 3:00
|-
! style=background:white colspan=9 |
|-  style="background:#cfc;"
| 2007-11-20 || Win ||align=left| Leonard Sitpholek || I-1 Superfights || Hong Kong || Decision (unanimous) || 5 || 3:00
|-  style="background:#fbb;"
| 2007-11-08 || Loss ||align=left| Lerdmongkon Sor. Tarntip || Phetjaopraya Fights, Rajadamnern Stadium || Bangkok, Thailand || Decision (unanimous) || 5 || 3:00
|-
! style=background:white colspan=9 |
|-  style="background:#cfc;"
| 2007-10-05 || Win ||align=left| Wanlop Sitpholek || Petchburi Stadium|| Bangkok, Thailand || Decision (unanimous) || 5 || 3:00
|-
! style=background:white colspan=9 |
|-  style="background:#c5d2ea;"
| 2007-09-01 || Draw ||align=left| Shane Chapman || Philip Lam promotion || Auckland, New Zealand || Draw || 5 || 3:00
|-  style="background:#cfc;"
| 2007-08-12 || Win ||align=left| Bibi Sitjaipetch || Queen's Birthday, Sanam Luang || Bangkok, Thailand || TKO || 3 || 1:35
|-
! style=background:white colspan=9 |
|-  style="background:#cfc;"
| 2007-06-26 || Win ||align=left| Ethan Sitjaipetch || Sangmorakot Fights, Lumpinee Stadium || Bangkok, Thailand || Decision (unanimous) || 5 || 3:00
|-  style="background:#cfc;"
| 2007-04-14 || Win ||align=left| Katel Kubis || Demolition V || São Paulo, Brazil || Decision (unanimous) || 5 || 3:00
|-  style="background:#cfc;"
| 2006-11-23 || Win ||align=left| Bruno Feitosa || Clã Fight || São Paulo, Brazil || TKO || 1 || N/A
|-  style="background:#cfc;"
| 2006-09-23 || Win ||align=left| Ricardo do Naciemento || Demolition IV || São Paulo, Brazil || Decision (unanimous) || 5 || 3:00
|-  style="background:#cfc;"
| 2006-06-02 || Win ||align=left| Eduardo Pachu || 1º Fight Leste || São Paulo, Brazil || KO || 3 || N/A
|-  style="background:#cfc;"
| 2005-11-19 || Win ||align=left| Lorand Sachs || SuperLeague Portugal 2005 || Carcavelos, Portugal || TKO (doctor stoppage) || 3 || N/A
|-  style="background:#cfc;"
| 2005-10-27 || Win ||align=left| Ariel Machado || K-1 Rules Heavyweight Factory GP || São Paulo, Brazil || Decision || 5 || 3:00
|-  style="background:#cfc;"
| 2005-09-10 || Win ||align=left| Marcos Caçador || Predator Fight Championships || Santos, Brazil || KO (knee) || 2 || 1:30
|-  style="background:#fbb;"
| 2005-06-20 || Loss ||align=left| Gianni Laterza || Wako-Pro Kickboxing || Italy || Decision || 10 || 2:00
|-  style="background:#cfc;"
| 2005-04-26 || Win ||align=left| Tiago Baggio || Seletiva Sul-Americana de Muay Thai || São Paulo, Brazil || KO || 2 || N/A
|-  style="background:#fbb;"
| 2004-05-29 || Loss ||align=left| Diego Braga || Nocaute GP: Never Shake || São Paulo, Brazil || KO || 2 || 0:18
|-  style="background:#cfc;"
| 2004-10-23 || Win ||align=left| Ed Mancada || Shooto Brazil || São Paulo, Brazil || KO || 2 || N/A
|-
| colspan=9 | Legend:

Boxing record 

|-  style="background:#cfc;"
| 2010-08-03 || Win ||align=left| Edaildo Silva || Torneio Estímulo Kid Jofre, semi final || São Paulo, Brazil || KO || 2 || N/A 
|-  style="background:#cfc;"
| 2010-07-13 || Win ||align=left| Marcos Lolata || Torneio Estímulo Kid Jofre, quarter final || São Paulo, Brazil || PTS || 4 || 3:00
|-
| colspan=9 | Legend:

Mixed martial arts record

|-
|Win
|align=center|8–1
|Sage Northcutt
|KO (punch)
|ONE Championship: Enter the Dragon
|
|align=center| 1
|align=center|0:29
|Kallang, Singapore
| 
|-
|Win
|align=center|7–1
|Musu Nuertiebieke
|TKO (punches)
|Superstar Fight 5 
|
|align=center| 1
|align=center| N/A
|Beijing, China
| 
|-
|Win
|align=center|6–1
|Rey Trujillo
|TKO (knee and punches)
|Legacy Fighting Championship 28
|
|align=center| 1
|align=center| 3:38
|Arlington, Texas, United States
|
|-
|Win
|align=center|5–1
|Josh Quayhagen
|Decision (unanimous)
|Bellator 80
|
|align=center| 3
|align=center| 5:00
|Hollywood, Florida, United States
| 
|-
|Win
|align=center|4–1
|Mike Bannon
|TKO (doctor stoppage)
|Bellator 77
|
|align=center| 2
|align=center| 5:00
|Reading, Pennsylvania, United States
| 
|-
|Win
|align=center|3–1
|Harry Johnson
|TKO (knee to the body)
|Bellator 73
|
|align=center| 2
|align=center| 0:39
|Tunica, Mississippi, United States
|
|-
|Win
|align=center|2–1
|LT Nelson
|Decision (unanimous)
|Bellator 67
|
|align=center| 3
|align=center| 5:00
|Rama, Ontario, Canada
|
|-
|Win
|align=center|1–1
|Avery McPhatter
|TKO (knees)
|Bellator 58
|
|align=center| 1
|align=center| 0:20
|Hollywood, Florida, United States
| 
|-
|Loss
|align=center|0–1
|Josh Quayhagen
|Decision (unanimous)
|Bellator 52
|
|align=center| 3
|align=center| 5:00
|Lake Charles, Louisiana, United States
|
|-

See also 
List of K-1 events
List of It's Showtime champions
List of male kickboxers

References

External links
 CosmoAlexandre.com.br (official website)
 

1982 births
Living people
Brazilian male boxers
Brazilian male kickboxers
Brazilian male mixed martial artists
Brazilian Muay Thai practitioners
Brazilian practitioners of Brazilian jiu-jitsu
Middleweight kickboxers
Lightweight mixed martial artists
Mixed martial artists utilizing boxing
Mixed martial artists utilizing Muay Thai
Mixed martial artists utilizing Brazilian jiu-jitsu
ONE Championship kickboxers
People from São Vicente, São Paulo
Sportspeople from São Paulo (state)